Randidangazhi is a 1958 Malayalam political film based on the novel of the same name by Thakazhi Sivasankara Pillai and directed by P. Subramaniam with Miss Kumari, P. J. Antony, T. S. Muthaiah, Thikkurissy Sukumaran Nair, Kottarakkara Sreedharan Nair, S. P. Pillai, Bahadoor, Adoor Pankajam, Soman and J. A. R. Anand in the star cast. It received a certificate of merit at the National Film Awards.

Cast
 Miss Kumari as Chirutha
 P. J. Antony as Koran
 T. S. Muthaiah as Chathan
 Thikkurissy Sukumaran Nair
 Kottarakkara Sreedharan Nair
 S. P. Pillai, Bahadoor
 Adoor Pankajam
 Soman
 J. A. R. Anand

Awards
National Film Awards
 1959 - National Film Award for Best Feature Film in Malayalam - Certificate of Merit

References

External links
 B. Vijayakumar. Randidangazhi 1958. The Hindu. 2 August 2008.
 Randidangazhi at the Malayalam Movie Database
 

1950s Malayalam-language films
Indian political films
Films based on Indian novels
Films directed by P. Subramaniam